Jimmy Endeley (born 3 September 1971) is a Swedish actor.

Endeley studied at Swedish National Academy of Mime and Acting in Stockholm 1992–95. He has been involved at Folkteatern in Gävle, Uppsala City Theatre and the Royal Dramatic Theatre. Endeley is best known for his role as Robban in the films about the police Martin Beck.

Filmography
Beck – Sista vittnet (2002)
Beck – Pojken i glaskulan (2002)
 2002 – Stackars Tom
Beck – Annonsmannen (2002)
Beck – Okänd avsändare (2002)
Beck – Enslingen (2002)
Beck – Kartellen (2002)
Beck – Mannen utan ansikte (2001)
Beck – Hämndens pris (2001)
 1999 – Ingen som jag
 1996 – En fyra för tre
Nöd ut (1996)

References

External links

1971 births
Swedish male actors
Living people